Amizour District is a district of Béjaïa Province, Algeria.

Municipalities
The district is further divided into 4 municipalities:
Amizour
Beni Djellil
Semaoune
Feraoun

References

Districts of Béjaïa Province